"Train of Love" is a song written and originally recorded by Johnny Cash.

The song was recorded by Cash in April 1956 and released as a single on Sun Records (Sun 258) in late 1956, with "There You Go" on the opposite side. The single reached #1 on Billboard's Most Played C&W in Juke Boxes chart

References 

Johnny Cash songs
1956 singles
Songs written by Johnny Cash
Sun Records singles
1956 songs